Isla Bonita (foaled 21 May 2011) is a Japanese Thoroughbred racehorse and sire. As a juvenile in 2013 he showed very promising form as he won three of his four races including the Icho Stakes and the Tokyo Sports Hai Nisai Stakes. In the following year he took the JRA Award for Best Three-Year-Old Colt after winning the Tokino Minoru Kinen, Satsuki Sho and St Lite Kinen as well as finishing second in the Tokyo Yushun and third in the autumn edition of the Tenno Sho. He failed to win in the net two years but ran well in several major races, being placed in the Tenno Sho and two runnings of the Mile Championship. In his final season he returned to winning form, taking the Yomiuri Milers Cup and the Hanshin Cup.

Background
Isla Bonita is a dark bay or brown horse standing 1.61 metres high, with a broad white blaze and three white socks bred and owned by the Shadai Racing Corporation. During his racing career he was trained by Hironori Kurita.

He was sired by the undefeated champion Fuji Kiseki whose four wins included the Grade 1 Asahi Hai Sansai Stakes in 1994. As a breeding stallion he sired several other major winners including Straight Girl, Kane Hekili, Danon Chantilly (NHK Mile Cup), Sadamu Patek (Mile Championship), Fine Grain (Takamatsunomiya Kinen) and Kinshasa No Kiseki (Takamatsunomiya Kinen). Isla Bonita's dam Isla Cozzene was an American mare whose wins included the Listed Hawthorne Oaks in 2005.

Racing career

2013: two-year-old season
On 2 June at Tokyo Racecourse Isla Bonita made a successful racecourse debut when he won an event for previously unraced juveniles over 1600 metres. In August at Niigata Racecourse he was stepped up in class for the Grade 3 Niigata Nisai Stakes and was beaten three lengths into second place by the filly Harp Star. At Tokyo in October the colt was dropped back to Listed class for the Icho Stakes over 1800 metres and won from Win Phoenix and ten others. For his final run of the year Isla Bonita started the 4.3/1 second favourite behind Satono Aladdin in the Grade 3 Tokyo Sports Hai Nisai Stakes over 1800 metres at Tokyo. Ridden by Masayoshi Ebina he won in a race record time of 1:45.9 by a neck from Pray And Real with Clarity City a length and a quarter back in third place.

2014: three-year-old season

On 24 February Isla Bonita began his second campaign in the Kyodo News Service Hai (a trial race for the Satsuki Sho) over 1800 metres at Tokyo. He headed the betting at odds of 6/5 and won by one and a quarter lengths from Bell Canyon, with two lengths back to Satono Aladdin in third. On his next appearance Isla Bonita, with Ebina in the saddle, was made the 4.1/1 second choice in the betting for the 74th running of the Satsuki Sho over 2000 metres at Nakayama Racecourse. The Yayoi Sho winner To The World started favourite, with the other sixteen runners including Asia Express, Rosa Gigantea (Spring Stakes), Tosen Stardom (Kisaragi Sho), One And Only (Radio Nikkei Hai Nisai Stakes), Clarity City and Bell Canyon. After racing in mid-division Isla Bonita moved up on the outside on the final turn and moved up to dispute the lead with Win Full Bloom, To The World, and Asia Express 200 metres from the finish. He drew ahead in the closing stages to win by one and a quarter lengths and half a length from To The World and Win Full Bloom in a time of 1:59.6. After the race Ebina said "I tried to race him with his own pace until the first corner and took him to the outside to avoid the crowd. He was responding well, and as I was able to race him towards the front, I urged him to go earlier. Although he seemed a bit distracted, he was able rally strongly with the other horses. He is able to run a smooth race and I think the Tokyo racecourse, where the Japanese Derby is held, will suit him well".

On 1 June Isla Bonita was stepped up in distance and was made the 1.7/1 favourite for the Japanese Derby over 2400 metres at Tokyo. After tracking the front-runners in third he moved up to dispute the lead in the straight but was outrun in the closing stages and beaten three quarters of a length into second place by One And Only.

After a three and a half months Isla Bonita returned in autumn for the St Lite Kinen (usually a trial race for the Kikuka Sho) over 2200 metres at Niigata on 21 September. He started the 2/5 favourite in an eighteen-runner field and won by one and a quarter lengths from To The World. Isla Bonita bypassed the Kikuka Sho and was matched against older horses for the first time in the autumn edition of the Tenno Sho over 2000 metres at Tokyo on 2 November. Ridden by Christophe Lemaire he started favourite and finished a close third behind the five-year-olds Spielberg and Gentildonna. On his final run of the season four weeks later he came home ninth of the seventeen finishers behind Epiphaneia in the Japan Cup.

In the 2014 World's Best Racehorse Rankings, Isla Bonita was given a rating of 117, making the 105th best horse in the world.

In January 2015 Isla Bonita was named Best Three-Year-Old Colt at the JRA Awards for 2014 taking 170 of the 285 votes.

2015 & 2016: four and five-year-old seasons

Isla Bonita began his 2015 season by coming home fifth behind the filly Nuovo Record when favourite for the Nakayama Kinen on 1 March. He was then off the track for over seven months before running third to A Shin Hikari in the Mainichi Okan at Tokyo on 11 October. On 1 November he ran for the second time in the autumn Tenno Sho and finished third of the eighteen runners beaten half a length and three quarters of a length by Lovely Day and Staphanos. For his final run of 2015 the colt was dropped back in distance for the Mile Championship over 1600 metres at Kyoto Racecourse three weeks later and started favourite. He recovered from a poor start to produce a strong late run but was unable to catch the leaders and came home third behind Maurice and Fiero. Despite failing to win a race, Isla Bonita's earnings for the year came to ¥86,216,000, equivalent to approximately $770,000. His rating of 116 placed him 139th in the 2015 World's Best Racehorse Rankings.

Isla Bonita did not produce his best form in the spring of 2016, finishing ninth to Duramente in the Nakayama Kinen, fifth to Ambitious in the Osaka Hai and fifth to Logotype in the Yasuda Kinen. The last named race was the last in which the horse was partnered by Ebina: Lemaire rode Isla Bonita in all of his subsequent races. The horse returned from a four and a half month summer break to finish second to Young Man Power in the Grade 3 Fuji Stakes over 1600 metres at Tokyo in October. In the following month he ran for the second time in the Mile Championship for which he started the 3.8/1 second favourite. After racing in sixth place he produced an "impressive late charge" on the outside but failed by a head to overhaul Mikki Isle. On 24 December he was dropped back to 1400 metres for the Grade 2 Hanshin Cup and finished second, beaten a head by the three-year-old Shuji. His earnings for the season totaled ¥102,518,000 (about $916,000) and his end-of-year rating of 117 placed him 110th in the 2016 World's Best Racehorse Rankings.

2017: six-year-old season
On his first run of 2017 Isla Bonita started second favourite behind Air Spinel in the Yomiuri Milers Cup over 1600 metres at Kyoto on 23 April in an eleven-runner field which also included Young Man Power and Fiero. He recorded his first victory in more than two and a half years as he won by half a length from Air Spinel. On 4 June he started favourite for the Yasuda Kinen but was repeatedly denied a clear run in the straight and came home eighth of the eighteen runners behind Satono Aladdin.

After the summer break Isla Bonita began his autumn campaign in the Fuji Stakes on 21 October and finished second, two lengths behind the winner Air Spinel. In November he started favourite in his third attempt to win the Mile Championship. He again encountered trouble in running before staying on strongly in the closing stages to finish fifth, one and a half lengths behind the three-year-old winner Persian Knight. On his final racecourse appearance Isla Bonita started the 3.1/1 second choice in the betting behind Mozu Ascot in an eighteen-runner field for the Hanshin Cup on 24 December. He ended his track career with a victory as he prevailed by a nose from the seven-year-old Dance Director. The winning time of 1:19.5 was a new race record.

In the 2017 World's Best Racehorse Rankings was rated at 117, making him the 129th best racehorse in the world.

Stud record
After the end of his racing career, Isla Bonita became a breeding stallion at the Shadai Stallion Station in Hokkaido.

Pedigree

References

2011 racehorse births
Racehorses bred in Japan
Racehorses trained in Japan
Thoroughbred family 4-n